The Beirut Marathon, is an annual event that takes place in Beirut, Lebanon, first held in 2003.  It is a founding member of Asian Premier Marathons, and was accredited as a Silver Label Road Race by the IAAF.  Unifying members of all political groups is a central theme to the race.

The marathons are managed by the Beirut Marathon Association, a non-profit non-governmental organization registered under the Ministry of Youth and Sports in Lebanon.  It is sponsored by the BLOM Bank.

History 
The race, created by businesswoman May El-Khalil, has the theme of unity at its core.

The first marathon was held on October 19, 2003 and attracted over 6,000 runners from 49 countries, and tens of thousands of Lebanese and international spectators. These numbers increased every year, most notably reaching 32,000 runners from 71 countries in the 2009 BLOM Beirut Marathon, and over 47,800 runners in 2017.

The 2010 edition of the men's race was won by the pacemaker Mohamed Temam. Hussein Awadah broke the Lebanese record at the race that year, completing the distance in at a time of 2:20:31.

In 2011, the course was altered to make it faster and easier to organise and the men's and women's record were both improved that year; Seada Kedir knocked over five minutes off the women's best time.

The inaugural season of Asian Premier Marathons was held in 2017–18, with Beirut Marathon, Beijing Marathon, and Seoul Marathon as its founding members.

The 2019 edition of the race was cancelled due to anti-government protests, with all registrants given the option of transferring their entry to 2020 or obtaining a refund.

The 2020 edition of the race was cancelled due to the coronavirus pandemic, with all who had transferred their entry from 2019 given the option of obtaining a refund.

Other activities 
Beirut Marathon Association also organizes their annual marathon village which was sponsored by Transmed in 2017.  The village comprises an expo, Souk El Akel Food Market, BLOM Bank Beirut Marathon Bib Pick-up, 15th Year Museum, Activations and many more activities by exhibitors.

Community impact 
The race reaches out to all sides of the political spectrum in Lebanon.  The day's events also include a 3 km race for MPs of any political allegiance, as well as members of the United Nations Interim Force in Lebanon stationed in the country.

Winners 

Key: Course record (in bold)

Notes

References

External links
 Official website
 AIMS Statistics

Recurring sporting events established in 2003
Marathons in Lebanon
Marathon
Annual sporting events in Lebanon
2003 establishments in Lebanon
Autumn events in Lebanon
Organisations based in Beirut